Hypselobarbus nilgiriensis is a species of cyprinid in the genus Hypselobarbus.

References

Cyprinidae
Fish of India
Cyprinid fish of Asia